Piera Pistono (born 15 July 1938) is an Italian pianist and composer. She was born in Bangkok, Thailand, and studied music in Rome, graduating in piano, choral music and choral conducting. After completing her studies, she took a teaching position at the Conservatory of Santa Cecilia.

Works
Selected works include:
Piano Sonata (1983)
Guitar Slides (1987)
ESP for clarinet and piano (1990)
Tokamak for ensemble (1992)
Parameters of the parties for voice, flute, clarinet, cello (1992)
Song of the bread for mezzo-soprano, flute and cello (2002)
Ignorabimus for chorus and orchestra (1992)

Her works have been recorded and issued on CD.

References

1938 births
Living people
20th-century classical composers
Italian music educators
Women classical composers
Italian classical composers
Piera Pistono
20th-century Italian composers
Women music educators
20th-century women composers